Robert Harvey James (born August 15, 1958), is a former professional baseball player who pitched in the major leagues primarily as a relief pitcher from 1978-1987.

Career
James was the first round draft pick in 1976 by the Montreal Expos out of Verdugo Hills High School, where he had been converted from a catcher to a pitcher, and joined the major league team in 1978 when he was just twenty years old. In 1982 he was traded to the Detroit Tigers for a player to be named later, and was himself returned to the Expos as that player in 1983. On December 7, 1984, James was traded to the Chicago White Sox for Vance Law. The following season, he saved 32 games for the White Sox, second in the American League behind Dan Quisenberry. James pitched two more years for the White Sox before being released.

References

1958 births
Living people
American expatriate baseball players in Canada
Baseball players from California
Chicago White Sox players
Denver Bears players
Detroit Tigers players
Evansville Triplets players
Lethbridge Expos players
Major League Baseball pitchers
Memphis Chicks players
Montreal Expos players
West Palm Beach Expos players
Wichita Aeros players